Salil Vishnoi (born 9 July 1955) is an Indian politician from Kanpur, Uttar Pradesh who is the state vice president of Bharatiya Janata Party in Uttar Pradesh. He was former member of Uttar Pradesh Legislative Assembly from Arya Nagar. He has earlier served Generalganj constituency of Kanpur as MLA three times. He was the former student of BNSD Inter College.

References

External links
 Salil Vishnoi on Facebook

Politicians from Kanpur
Living people
Members of the Uttar Pradesh Legislative Assembly
Bharatiya Janata Party politicians from Uttar Pradesh
1955 births